Charles Joel Nordström Kinnaman (born 25 November 1979) is a Swedish-American actor and model who first gained recognition for his roles in the Swedish film Easy Money and the Johan Falk crime series. Kinnaman is known internationally for his television roles as Detective Stephen Holder in AMC's The Killing, Takeshi Kovacs in the first season of Altered Carbon, and Governor Will Conway in the U.S. version of House of Cards. He has also played Alex Murphy in the 2014 RoboCop remake, and Rick Flag in the Warner Bros. film adaptations of the DC Comics anti-hero team Suicide Squad (2016), as well as James Gunn's 2021 sequel/soft reboot, The Suicide Squad. Since 2019, he has starred as NASA astronaut Ed Baldwin in the Apple TV+ science fiction drama series For All Mankind.

Early life
Charles Joel Nordström Kinnaman was born and raised in Stockholm, Sweden. His mother, Bitte (Nordström), a therapist, is a Swedish citizen. His father, Steve Kinnaman (originally David Kinnaman), is an American-born Swede who was drafted during the Vietnam War and deserted the military from his base in Bangkok. Kinnaman is a dual citizen of Sweden and the United States. His father, whose family was from the American Midwest, is of Irish and Scottish descent; whereas his mother is of maternal Ukrainian Jewish descent. He has five sisters, one of whom is actress Melinda Kinnaman (paternal half-sister). During his childhood, Kinnaman learned two languages as he "spoke English with my dad and Swedish with my mom". He spent a year in Del Valle, Texas, as a high school exchange student. Prior, Kinnaman revealed that he grew up with fellow actors Alexander Skarsgård and Noomi Rapace. After graduating from high school, he decided to travel around the world. To finance the trips, he worked in various jobs  as a beer factory line worker and roof-sweeper in Norway, and as a bar manager in the French Alps. He then traveled for four to five months at a time over a period of two years in Southeast Asia and South America, the latter with fellow Scandinavian actor David Dencik.

Career

Kinnaman began his acting career as a child actor in Swedish soap opera  (1990). His older sister was dating one of the show's directors, and he asked Kinnaman to audition for a part on the show. After portraying Felix Lundström in 22 episodes, he stepped away from acting.

Kinnaman restarted his acting career in 2002. While studying at drama school, Kinnaman featured in several films such as Hannah med H and God Save the King (Swedish: Tjenare kungen). He also worked on productions staged at the Backa Theatre in Gothenburg. He graduated from Malmö Theatre Academy in 2007 and started working at the Gothenburg City Theatre. In the same year, he attracted the attention of Swedish media with the role of Raskolnikov in a stage adaptation of Crime and Punishment. Kinnaman went on to star in nine Swedish films in 14 months. In 2009, he starred in the film In Your Veins and played the role of a police informant in six films of the Johan Falk film series. He was cast in the film Easy Money (released January 2010), which brought him mainstream attention in Sweden and at the international film market, and also earned him a Guldbagge Award in the Best Actor category.

Looking to expand his acting career, Kinnaman hired an agent in the United States. It was announced in the spring of 2010 that he would be making his international film debut in the thriller The Darkest Hour, which began filming in Moscow in June 2010 and was released in December 2011. Between April 2011 and August 2014, Kinnaman had a four-season starring role as Detective Stephen Holder in the AMC television series The Killing, based on the Danish television series Forbrydelsen. Kinnaman was one of the contenders for the lead roles in Thor (2011) and Mad Max: Fury Road (2015). Although Kinnaman said that he is eager to work and become recognized in the U.S., he added that "I absolutely don't feel that I have to take any role that I can get just because it is the United States. I'm looking for something interesting, I'm still young in my artistry, and I must dare to do things even when there's a risk for failure".

In 2012, Kinnaman reunited with Easy Money director Daniel Espinosa in the latter's Hollywood debut, Safe House, and also starred in the indie film Lola Versus. On 3 March 2012, it was confirmed that Kinnaman would play the lead role of Alex James Murphy/RoboCop in the remake of 1987's RoboCop. The film was released in February 2014. In 2015, he starred in the action thriller Run All Night and mystery drama Child 44.

In 2016, Kinnaman played Rick Flag in the Warner Bros. film adaptation of DC Comics anti-hero team Suicide Squad, directed by David Ayer. He reprised his role as Rick Flag in its 2021 sequel/soft reboot, The Suicide Squad, directed by James Gunn. He also starred in the independent drama-thriller film Edge of Winter, in which he plays Elliot Baker, a father of two who takes his children on a shooting trip that goes wrong. The film was released on demand on 27 July 2016, and in select theaters on 12 August 2016.

Between 2016 and 2019, Kinnaman worked on 4 different original productions of streaming television networks such as Netflix, Amazon Prime Video and Apple TV+. Kinnaman played Governor Will Conway in Seasons 4 and 5 of the U.S. version of House of Cards on the streaming service Netflix, and the protagonist Takeshi Kovacs in Netflix's Altered Carbon, an adaption of Richard K. Morgan's hardboiled cyberpunk science fiction novel of the same name. Also in 2019, Kinnaman starred as Erik in the Amazon Prime Video series Hanna, an adaptation of the 2011 action film of the same name. Since 2019, Kinnaman starred as NASA astronaut Ed Baldwin in the Apple TV+ original science fiction space drama series For All Mankind.

In 2019, Kinnaman played Pete Koslow in Andrea Di Stefano's action thriller film The Informer. In 2020, Kinnaman starred as Thomas Steinman in Yuval Adler's post-war thriller The Secrets We Keep. Kinnaman also starred in Jérémie Guez's crime drama Brothers by Blood which was released in the United States in 2021. In January 2021, it was announced that Kinnaman was cast in Season 4 of the In Treatment reboot at HBO. He will star as Adam, the on and off boyfriend of the main character Dr. Brooke Taylor (played by Uzo Aduba). He also reprised his role as Ed Baldwin in Season 2 of For All Mankind, which aired in 2021, and is confirmed to be in the third season of the Apple TV+ series.

Personal life
Kinnaman grew up with the condition of pectus excavatum, with a caved-in appearance of the chest. He underwent surgery prior to the filming of Altered Carbon, inserting two metal bars to push the sternum outward in order to correct the deformity.

Kinnaman has been a fan of his hometown football club Hammarby IF from an early age.

Due to his constant traveling, Kinnaman's accent is noticeably mixed. While he identifies it as an American accent, he has stated that the "melody" is wrong and has since been working to perfect it.

Kinnaman was married to Swedish tattoo artist Cleo Wattenström from 2015 to 2018. He subsequently began a relationship with Swedish-Australian model Kelly Gale in early 2019. The couple announced their engagement in January 2021.

On 6 August 2021, Kinnaman filed and was granted a temporary restraining order against his ex Gabriella Magnusson, who he alleged was threatening him in an attempt to extort him after they had been in a brief romantic relationship in late 2018. Magnusson denied trying to extort Kinnaman. On 11 August, the Swedish Prosecution Authority confirmed that Kinnaman had been accused of rape in an ongoing investigation.

Filmography

Film

Television

Awards and nominations

References

External links

 
 
 
 

1979 births
20th-century American male actors
20th-century Swedish male actors
21st-century American male actors
21st-century Swedish male actors
Swedish emigrants to the United States
American male film actors
American male television actors
American people of Irish descent
American people of Scottish descent
American people of Swedish-Jewish descent
American people of Ukrainian-Jewish descent
Best Actor Guldbagge Award winners
Living people
Male actors from Stockholm
Swedish male film actors
Swedish male television actors
Swedish people of American descent
Swedish people of Irish descent
Swedish people of Scottish descent
Swedish people of Jewish descent